Sky City 1000 is a proposed skyscraper for the Tokyo metropolitan area. It was announced in 1989 at the height of the Japanese asset price bubble. 

The design, proposed in 1989 by the Takenaka Corporation, would have housed between 35,000 and 36,000 full-time residents as well as 100,000 workers. It comprised 14 concave dish-shaped "Space Plateaus" stacked one upon the other. The interior of the plateaus would have contained greenspace, and the edges of the building would have contained apartments. The building would have also housed offices, commercial facilities, schools, theatres, and other modern amenities.

The Sky City was featured on Discovery Channel's Extreme Engineering in 2003. 

Land prices in Japan were the highest in the world at the time, but Kisho Kurokawa, one of Japan's most famous architects, has said that staggeringly ambitious buildings employing highly sophisticated engineering are still cheap, because companies pay 90 percent of the cost for the land and only 10 percent for the building. Tokyo's only fire helicopter has even been used in simulation tests to see what the danger would be if a fire were to break out in the building. To mitigate this, triple-decker high speed elevators were proposed and prototyped in labs outside Tokyo.

Although the Sky City gained more serious attention than many of its alternatives, it was never carried out, similarly to projects such as X-Seed 4000 and to ultra-high density, mixed use concepts such as Paolo Soleri's Arcology and Le Corbusier's Ville Radieuse.

If completed, Sky City 1000 would be the tallest man-made structure in the world surpassing the Burj Khalifa.

See also
Bionic Tower
Madinat al-Hareer
Sky Mile Tower

References

Proposed skyscrapers in Japan
Unbuilt buildings and structures in Japan
Skyscrapers in Tokyo
Unbuilt skyscrapers